Pampa Calichera (IPSA:CALICHERAA) is a Chile-based investment company.

The company is a major shareholder of SQM.

References

Investment companies of Chile
2003 establishments in Chile